Julia Mary Howard Smith,  (born 29 May 1956) is Chichele Professor of Medieval History at All Souls College, Oxford. She was formerly Edwards Professor of Medieval History at the University of Glasgow. She is a graduate of Newnham College, University of Cambridge (BA, 1978), and Corpus Christi College, University of Oxford (D.Phil., 1985).

Early life and education 
Smith was born on 29 May 1956 in Cambridge, Cambridgeshire, England. She was educated at South Hampstead High School, an all-girls Private school in London. She studied at Newnham College, Cambridge, from 1975 to 1978, followed by postgraduate study at Corpus Christi College, Oxford, from 1978 to 1981.

Academic career
She lectured at the University of Sheffield, the University of St Andrews, and  the University of Manchester in the 1980s. In 1986, she was appointed an assistant professor at Trinity College, Hartford, Connecticut. In 1995, she joined the University of St Andrews as Reader in Medieval History. In 2005, she was appointed Edwards Professor of Medieval History at the University of Glasgow.

In 2016, Smith was appointed Chichele Professor of Medieval History at the University of Oxford and elected a fellow of All Souls College, Oxford. She gave her inaugural lecture as Chichele Professor on 31 January 2019: it was tiled "Thinking with Things: Reframing Relics in the Early Middle Ages".

She has held a range of international research fellowships. From 1999 to 2000 she was a fellow at the Netherlands Institute of Advanced Study and in 2001 and 2013 she held a fellowship at the Shelby Cullom Davis Center for Historical Studies, Princeton.

Personal life
In 2005, Smith married fellow historian Hamish Scott.

Honours and awards 
In 2010 she delivered the Raleigh Lecture on the subject of relics in the Medieval West. In 2011 she was elected as a Fellow of the Royal Society of Edinburgh. Smith delivered the Birbkbeck lecture series at Trinity College, Cambridge in 2018, on the subject "The Religious Life of Things in Early Christianity".

Selected publications
Province and Empire: Brittany and the Carolingians. Cambridge University Press, Cambridge, 1992.
"Einhard: the sinner and the saint", Transactions of the Royal Historical Society (Sixth series), 13, 2003, pp. 55–77.
Europe after Rome: a New Cultural History 500–1000. Oxford University Press, Oxford, 2005. 
Early Medieval Christianities, c. 600 – c. 1100, Cambridge University Press, Cambridge, 2008.  (Edited with T. F. X. Noble)
"Portable Christianity: relics in the Medieval west (c. 700 – c. 1200)" in Proceedings of the British Academy, 2012, 181 . pp. 143–167. ISSN 0068-1202

References

External links 
http://www.academia-net.org/profil/prof-julia-m-h-smith/1215915

Academics of the University of Glasgow
British women historians
British medievalists
Women medievalists
Living people
Alumni of Corpus Christi College, Oxford
Alumni of Newnham College, Cambridge
Fellows of the Royal Historical Society
Fellows of the Society of Antiquaries of Scotland
Fellows of All Souls College, Oxford
Chichele Professors of Medieval History
1956 births